Carl Liner may refer to:

 Carl August Liner (1871–1946), Swiss painter
 Carl Walter Liner (1914–1997), Swiss painter